Community Action Against Homophobia (CAAH) is a community activist organisation based in Sydney, Australia. Since its establishment in 1999, CAAH has aimed to eliminate homophobia and achieve full equality for queer people—defined as "lesbian, gay, bisexual, same sex attracted, transgender, intersex or non-heterosexually identifying" in the CAAH constitution.

History
CAAH began in 1999 with a group of students already active within the Sydney queer student movement. At a time when student dissent against aggressive government policies was reaching a fruition across the country, the queer movement was no exception, and groups like the Cross Campus Sexuality Network (CCSN) were already active in New South Wales. However it was felt that these groups were not properly engaging with the broader community and so an offshoot was created which combined a more radical political message with an intent to galvanise the broader community around issues of liberation and representation.

In 1999 Collective Action Against Homophobia was formed to protest against a Catholic anti-gay organisation known as Courage, which preached a message that homosexuality was a disease that needed to be cured. Activists managed to have that meeting shut down and the organisation removed from university campus. The collective was then disbanded.

In 2000 a new group taking inspiration from the defunct Collective Action Against Homophobia formed Community Action Against Homophobia, taking the democratic principles and practices of the previous group and broadening the scope to include general community members as well as students.

Politics
CAAH's politics are mostly left-wing. CAAH's origins in the student movement in Sydney are reflected in an underlying commitment to social justice issues and solidarity with other struggles. In its early days CAAH was active in generating queer blocks for anti-globalisation protests, union rallies, student protests, anti-war demonstrations and other diverse left-wing causes. CAAH members' political views range across the spectrum of politics in Australia. Some members are also members of political parties, including the Labor Party, Greens, Socialist Alliance and Socialist Alternative. As the organisation changes various means are employed to effect change and these have altered the focus of the organising from a predominantly student based body to a community organisation that uses lobbying and persuasion as well as protest and civil disobedience to achieve its objectives.siti caah

Campaigns

Equal relationship recognition
CAAH's campaign for equal relationship recognition is an all-inclusive campaign for equality. While some organisations concentrate on a single model of relationship recognition, CAAH demands that all choices be available to all people regardless of their sexuality or gender. This includes de facto relationships, civil unions, and marriage. Together with Australian Marriage Equality and Equal Love, CAAH organises the annual Same Sex Marriage National Day of Action in Sydney on the weekend closest to the anniversary of the same sex ban passed on Black Friday, 13 August 2005.

CAAH was instrumental in the successful Marriage Equality Campaign and was pivotal in calling the protests of up to 50 000 people in Sydney in 2017. These protests were crucial as they pressured the then Liberal government to call a referendum, which resulted in more than 60% of Australians voting "yes".

Queer refugees

CAAH supports people who faced homophobia and persecution in their home countries because of their sexuality and/or gender, and as a result seek asylum in Australia. These asylum seekers are imprisoned by the Australian government in detention centres such as Villawood Immigration Detention Centre.

Greens anti-discrimination amendment
CAAH also supports Lee Rhiannon's private members' bill  that would amend New South Wales anti-discrimination legislation. Currently, private schools and businesses with fewer than six employees are permitted to discriminate on sexuality, disability, gender or age. Lee Rhiannon's bill would remove the special exemptions for private schools and businesses employing fewer than six people.

Criticism
CAAH undertakes campaigns in conjunction with the Equal Love and Australian Marriage Equality organisations.  CAAH have been criticised for their radical slogans and campaigning methods. Rodney Croome, National Convener of Australian Marriage Equality, has expressing his concerns on this issue, saying, "It is also a double standard to demand respect for same-sex relationships without showing the same respect in return". A previous Co-convenor of CAAH has also strongly expressed his concern.

See also

Australian Marriage Equality
Equal Love
LGBT rights in Australia
List of LGBT rights organizations

References

External links
Anti-discrimination amendment

LGBT political advocacy groups in Australia
1999 establishments in Australia
Anti-homophobia
Organisations based in Sydney